Karl Schulze (born 5 March 1988) is a German rower. He was part of the German crew that won the gold medal in the men's quadruple sculls at the 2012 Summer Olympics in London.  He won again in the men's quadruple sculls at the 2016 Rio Olympics as part of the German team.

References

External links
 

1988 births
Living people
German male rowers
Rowers from Dresden
Rowers at the 2012 Summer Olympics
Rowers at the 2016 Summer Olympics
Rowers at the 2020 Summer Olympics
Olympic rowers of Germany
Olympic gold medalists for Germany
Olympic medalists in rowing
Medalists at the 2012 Summer Olympics
Medalists at the 2016 Summer Olympics
World Rowing Championships medalists for Germany
European Rowing Championships medalists